Princess is an  steam locomotive built by George England for the Ffestiniog Railway in 1863. It is one of the earliest narrow gauge steam locomotives and is one of the three oldest surviving narrow gauge locomotives still on its original railway.

History

Princess was the first steam locomotive delivered to the Ffestiniog Railway. She was originally named The Princess - after Princess Alexandra of Denmark - and carried the number 1. As delivered she was an 0-4-0 side tank without a cab. She began hauling public trains in September 1863.

From 1868, The Princess began hauling trains on the Festiniog and Blaenau Railway as well as the Ffestiniog Railway.

In December 1882, The Princess underwent a substantial overhaul and a large cast iron weight was placed over the side tanks and boiler, giving the locomotive extra adhesive weight and the appearance of a saddle tank. She continued to run a significant mileage during the 1880s and early 1890s. In 1893 she underwent another major overhaul, receiving a full cab and a true saddle tank; at the same time her name was shortened to Princess. After returning from overhaul in 1923, Princess also worked trains on the Welsh Highland Railway which by then was being operated by the Ffestiniog Railway. She worked until the closure of the Ffestiniog Railway on 1 August 1946, when she hauled the last train.

After the railway was saved for preservation, Princess remained in the same condition she was withdrawn in. In 1969 she was put on public display at Blaenau Ffestiniog. In 1981, after being repainted in a red livery, she was placed in Spooner's Bar at Harbour Station.

In 2012, Princess was moved out of Spooner's, and in 2013 she was displayed at Paddington Station to commemorate the 150th. anniversary of its construction.

See also
 List of Ffestiniog Railway rolling stock

References

External links
 Festipedia page on Ffestiniog Railway locomotives

Ffestiniog Railway
Narrow gauge locomotives of the United Kingdom
George England and Company locomotives
Railway locomotives introduced in 1863
0-4-0ST locomotives
Individual locomotives of Great Britain